Bhaca, or IsiBhaca (Baca) is a Bantu language of South Africa. Traditionally considered a dialect of Swati, it is closer to Zulu,  Phuthi and Xhosa. It is spoken southeast of Lesotho, where Sotho, Xhosa and Zulu meet, mainly around Mount Frere, Mzimkhulu, and to a lesser extent in Mount Ayliff, Matatiele, Harding, Bulwer, Underberg, Highflats, Umzinto, Umzumbe and Ixopo.

Vocabulary
Months in IsiBhaca:

Example: 

Translation [Xhosa/Zulu/English]: : : "Please buy me eggs and milk when you go out"

References

Nguni languages